Mihaela Cristina Lulea (born 5 September 1981) is a Romanian paracanoeist and former para table tennis player. She played table tennis nationally and competes in paracanoe events internationally.

Lulea lost her leg aged twelve when a bear grabbed her leg while she was leaning against the railings of the bear's enclosure at a zoo. Once she freed herself from the bear's grip, she went to pick up her jacket but slipped and the bear grabbed and pulled her in again. The bear seriously bitten her leg and her leg injury was so severe that doctors had to amputate her leg from the knee down.

References

1981 births
Living people
Sportspeople from Timișoara
Romanian female canoeists
Paracanoeists of Romania
Paracanoeists at the 2016 Summer Paralympics
Romanian amputees